The Nigerian National Assembly delegation from Rivers comprises three Senators representing Rivers East, Rivers West, Rivers South East and thirteen Representatives representing Degema/Bonny,  Okrika/Ogu-Bolo,  Asalga/Akulga,  Ahoada West/Ogba-Egbema-Ndoni,  Port Harcourt 1,  Ikwerre/Emohua,  Khana/Gokana,  Etche/Omuma,  Tai/Eleme/Oyigbo,  Abua-Odual/Ahoada East,  Obio/Akpor,  Port Harcourt 2,  Andoni/Opobo/Nkoro.

Fourth Republic

The 9th Parliament (2019 - 2023)

The 8th Parliament (2015 - 2019)

The 7th Parliament (2011 - 2015)

The 6th Parliament (2007 - 2011)

The 5th Parliament (2003 - 2007)

The 4th Parliament (1999 - 2003)

References
Official Website - National Assembly House of Representatives (Rivers State)
 Senator List

National Assembly (Nigeria) delegations by state
Lists of Rivers State politicians